Sunparks is a European Brand of Holiday Villages from Center Parcs Europe. Sunparks runs eight parks: four Belgian Parks, two Dutch Parks and two German Parks. In 2011 Sunparks will take over a third Dutch park from Landal Greenparks.

History

In 1981 Sun International opened the first Park in Oostduinkerke, called Sunclub Groendijk. In 1987 they built a second park in De Haan which would get a covered park centre (based on the idea of Center Parks), so it was suitable for all climatic conditions. From this moment they decided to exploit the parks under the name Sunparks. Sunparks Groendijk was from now on called Sunparks Oostduinkerke and the new park got the name Sunparks De Haan. In 1992 a third park followed in the Ardennes, Sunparks Vielsalm, and because of its success followed a fourth park in 1994, Sunparks Rauwse Meren. The director of Sunparks first wanted to let Sunparks grow to 10 parks, but he did not succeed because of financial difficulties. In 1997 Sun International was sold, and the Sunparks brand was taken over by Mark Vanmoerkerke. In 2006 Roompot Holidays went into negotiations with Sunparks, to buy the brand, but they did not succeed and after all Pierre et Vacances (the owner of Center Parcs Europe) bought the Sunparks brand in 2007.
On 13 November 2008 Center Parks Europe announced that they would continue with a two-brand-strategy: Center Parcs and Sunparks. This was an easy decision because Sunparks was inspired on Center Parcs. Center Parcs would contain the 5 star parks, and Sunparks would contain the 3 and 4 star parks. This meant that since 29 January 2009 the parks Loohorst, Zandvoort, Heilbachsee and Butjardinger Küste would be rebranded as Sunparks parks. At the beginning of 2011 the company decided to rename most of the Sunparks back into Center Parcs with only three Parks in Belgium remaining under the brand Sunparks.
On 4 January 2013 Center Parcs changed De Haan again to 'Sunparks De Haan aan zee'. According to the press release the brand name 'Center Parcs' created wrong expectations and the guests named the park 'Sunparks' anyway. Since then Sunparks again consists of the original 4 parks bought by Pierre & Vacances in 2007.

All Resorts

Expansion
In 2011 Sunparks was developing a German park in Bostalsee which would be called Sunparks Bostalsee, this park opened July 2014 under the Center Parcs brand.

External links
 Sunparks official website
 Center Parcs Europe official website
On Sunparks website it shows that they have recently taken over sites in France too.

References 
NL Wikipedia Sunparks 26 August 2010.
Sunparks Website 26 August 2010.

Center Parcs
Hotels established in 1981